Winkabar San Eain is a Burmese drama television series. It aired on MRTV-4, from November 23, 2015 to January 19, 2016, on Mondays to Fridays at 19:30 for 40 episodes.

Cast
Aung Min Khant as Sao Khun Hmaing
 Aung Yay Chan as Sai San
 Phone Shein Khant as Nay Ba La
 Zin Myo as U Gyi Aung
 Poe Kyar Phyu Khin as Mabel Mari Myint
 Myat Thu Thu as Khan Mon
 Hsaung Wutyee May as Saw Kalyar
 Shwe Eain Min as Nan Shwe Phoo, Nan Kyar (dual role)
 Khine Hnin Wai as Daw Mya Thet Wai
 Phu Sone as Daw Shwe Nu Yin

References

Burmese television series
MRTV (TV network) original programming